Józef Trzemeski (1878-1923) was a Polish physicist, general, and member of the Russian expedition to the Kara Sea in 1914-1915.

External links
  "Wyprawa podbiegunowa na statku «Eklips» w roku 1914 i 1915", "Przegląd Geograficzny. Organ Polskiego Towarzystwa Geograficznego", t. IV (1923), Warszawa 1924, s. 151-153

Further reading
 
 

1878 births
1923 deaths
20th-century Polish physicists
Polish generals
Polish explorers
Military personnel who committed suicide
Suicides by firearm in Poland